Eliso Virsaladze (born September 14, 1942) is a Georgian pianist.

Biography 

She was born in Tbilisi, Georgian SSR. Her father Constantine Virsaladze was a prominent doctor and scientist, so was her grandfather Spiridon Virsaladze. She received her first piano lessons at the age of 9 from her grandmother, Anastasia Virsaladze, a well-known pianist and professor in Georgia. From the age of 9, she also started receiving lessons from Heinrich Neuhaus up until his last days.  She graduated from the Tbilisi State Conservatory (Class of Anastasia Virsaladze), and continued her education as a postgraduate student at the Moscow Conservatory with Yakov Zak. She has also played for A. Goldenweiser and N. Perelman many times.

She won the 3rd prize in the International Tchaikovsky Competition in Moscow in 1962 and the 1st prize in the Robert Schumann International Competition in Zwickau, Germany in 1966.

Sviatoslav Richter considered her the best female pianist of her time, and the best interpreter of Schumann.

Considered a great pianist, Virsaladze has been teaching at Moscow Conservatory since 1967 (She became a professor in 1994), University of Music and Performing Arts of Munich, Germany (1995-2011). From 2010 She is Professor at Scuola di Musica di Fiesole in Florence, Italy. She regularly gives masterclasses all over the world.

Among her most outstanding students are: B. Berezovsky, E. Voskresenskaya, V. Bronevetsky, Y. Katznelson, R. Saitkoulov, A. Volodin, D. Kaprin, A. Shaikin, M. Kolomiytseva, A. Madžar,A. Osminin, L. Bustani, A. Zuev, M. Nahapetov, J.H.Park, E. Richter, D. Mazmanishvili, P. Rossi, V. Petrov, D. Shishkin, D. Klinton (Nadzhafova), V. Starikov, T. Yang.

Since 1975, she has served on the jury of many well-known international competitions, including: Queen Elisabeth Competition, Arthur Rubinstein International Piano Competition, R. Schumann International Competition, Géza Anda International Piano Competition, International Tchaikovsky Competition, Paloma O'Shea Santander International Piano Competition,  Tbilisi International Piano Competition and many others.

Eliso Virsaladze can speak 9 languages.

Orchestras and chamber music 

Since 1966, Eliso Virsaladze has given recitals and appeared with major international orchestras under Yevgeny Svetlanov, Kyrill Kondrashin, Riccardo Muti, Yuri Temirkanov, Kurt Sanderling, Mariss Jansons, Marin Alsop, Wolfgang Sawallisch, Mikhail Pletnev, Vakhtang and Jansug Kakhidze and many others.

Virsaladze enjoys playing chamber music, partnering with Natalia Gutman,Oleg Kagan, the Borodin and the Taneyev Quartets. She is an interpreter of Schumann, Beethoven,  Bach,  Mozart, Chopin and so many others. Live Classics has recorded most of her broad repertoire.

She was awarded the title of People's Artist of the Georgian SSR in 1971, and of People's Artist of the USSR in 1989.

See also 
Virsaladze, Georgian family name.

References

External links 
 Richter Competition
 Archives
 Eliso Virsaladze Interview by Willem Boone

1942 births
Living people
People's Artists of the USSR
Classical pianists from Georgia (country)
Women pianists from Georgia (country)
Women classical pianists
Musicians from Tbilisi
Moscow Conservatory alumni
Academic staff of Moscow Conservatory
Piano pedagogues
Tbilisi State Conservatoire alumni